Alexander Kiselyov (alternatively spelled Kiselev) is the name of:

Alexander Kiselyov (painter) (1838–1911), Russian landscape painter
Alexander Kiselev (mathematician), 2012 Guggenheim Fellowships award recipient
Alexander Kiselyov (businessman), CEO of Svyazinvest, Russia's largest telecommunications holding company

See also
Kiselyov